The history of the Jews in Eritrea stretches back many centuries. Eritrea once had a substantial Jewish community, fueled by immigrants arriving for economic reasons and to escape persecution. The community thrived for several decades before mass emigration began during the Eritrean War of Independence with Ethiopia.

History

It is believed that before Orthodox Christianity became the official religion of Abyssinia (ancient Eritrea and northern Ethiopia) in the 4th century, Judaism had a heavy presence in Eritrea. Those who refused to embrace the new religion were compelled to seek refuge in the mountains of southern Ethiopia. This explains the concentration of Jews known as Beta Israel or Falasha in Gondar, Ethiopia and southern Tigray. However, there was not much oppression against ethnic Jews.

The present Eritrean Jewish community is believed to be started by Yemenite Jews from Yemen attracted by new commercial opportunities driven by Italian colonial expansion in the late 19th century. In 1906, the Asmara Synagogue was completed in Asmara, the capital. It includes a main sanctuary which can seat up to 200 people, classrooms, and a small Jewish cemetery.

In the 1930s, the Jewish community was bolstered when many European Jews emigrated to Eritrea to escape Nazi persecution in Europe.

During British administration, Eritrea was often used as a location of internment for Irgun and Lehi guerrillas fighting for Jewish independence in the British Mandate of Palestine (now Israel). Among those imprisoned were future Israeli Prime Minister Yitzhak Shamir and Haim Corfu, a founder of Beitar Jerusalem.

In 1948, after Israel was founded as a Jewish state, many Eritrean Jews emigrated to Israel. In the 1950s, 500 Jews still lived in the country. The last Jewish wedding at Asmara Synagogue was celebrated during that decade. The synagogue also served Jews who came from all over Africa to observe the High Holy Days there.

In 1961 the Eritrean War for Independence began after Eritrea was annexed by Ethiopia, and Eritreans began to fight for independence. It was then that Jews began to leave Eritrea. In the early 1970s, Jewish emigration increased because of ensuing violence between Eritrea and Ethiopia. In 1975, the Chief Rabbi and much of the community were evacuated. Many Eritrean Jews settled in Israel, while others went to Europe or North America. By then, only 150 Jews remained in the country.

Eritrea formally gained its independence in 1993. At the time, there were only a handful of Jews still left in the country. All but one have either died or emigrated. Today, there is only one last native Jew left in Eritrea, Sami Cohen, who runs an import-export business and attends to the Asmara Synagogue. {In 2001 the Cohan family numbered four)There are also a few non-native Jews residing in Asmara, some of them Israelis attached to the local Israeli Embassy.

Judaism is not one of the four religions recognized by the Eritrean government. Despite this, the government never restricted Jewish freedom to worship, and the country has no history of any persecution of Jews.

References

 
Eritrea
Judaism in Africa
Yemeni-Jewish diaspora